Cedric "Sugar Ray" Xulu (13 December 1939 – 4 May 2020) was a South African footballer.

Career
Xulu was a footballer whose career in the 1960s led him to play for local side AmaZulu and Mbabane Swallows in Swaziland. In 1972, he played for Zulu Royals (now AmaZulu), who won the NPSL that season. He played for the SA Black XI in the 1970s, which he captained.

He received the Chairman's Award at the 2019 PSL Awards.

The stadium Sugar Ray Xulu Stadium in the City of Durban is named after him.

References

1939 births
2020 deaths
South African soccer players
AmaZulu F.C. players
Mbabane Swallows players
South African expatriate soccer players
South African expatriates in Eswatini
Expatriate soccer players in South Africa
Association footballers not categorized by position